The 2017 Currie Cup First Division was the second tier of the 2017 Currie Cup competition, an annual South African rugby union competition organised by the South African Rugby Union. It was the 79th edition of the competition and was contested between 25 August and 20 October 2017.

Competition rules and information

There were eight participating teams in the 2017 Currie Cup First Division. These eight teams played once against each other over the course of the competition, either at home or away. Teams received four points for a win and two points for a draw. Bonus points were awarded to teams that scored 4 or more tries in a game, as well as to teams that lost a match by 7 points or less. Teams were ranked by log points, then points difference (points scored less points conceded).

The top four teams qualified for the semi-finals, which was followed by a final.

Teams

The teams that participated in the 2017 Currie Cup First Division were:

Team Listing

Standings
The final log for the 2017 Currie Cup First Division was:

Round-by-round

The table below shows each team's progression throughout the season. For each round, each team's cumulative points total is shown with the overall log position in brackets.

Matches

Regular season

Round one

Round two

Round three

Round four

Round Five

Round Six

Round Seven

Title play-offs

Semi-finals

Final

Honours

The honour roll for the 2017 Currie Cup First Division was as follows:

Promotion/relegation play-off

Players

Squads

References

2017
2017 Currie Cup